The Yau Tsim Mong District Council is the district council for the Yau Tsim Mong District in Hong Kong. It is one of 18 such councils. The Yau Tsim Mong District Council currently consists of 20 members, of which the district is divided into 20 constituencies, electing a total of 20 members. It was merged from the Mong Kok District Board and Yau Tsim District Board in 1994 due to the significant drop of the population in the districts. The latest election was held on 24 November 2019.

History

The Yau Tsim Mong District Council was established on 1 October 1994 under the name of the Yau Tsim Mong District Board as the merger of Yau Tsim and Mong Kok District Boards. The two original District Boards was established as the result of the colonial Governor Murray MacLehose's District Administration Scheme reform. The District Boards were partly elected with the ex-officio Urban Council members, as well as members appointed by the Governor. In 1992, the last Governor Chris Patten announced the small District Boards would be merged. As the total number of seats of the two boards were only 27, the boards were merged into Yau Tsim Mong District Board in the 1994 election with the appointed seats abolished.

The Yau Tsim Mong District Board became Yau Tsim Mong Provisional District Board after the Hong Kong Special Administrative Region (HKSAR) was established in 1997 with the appointment system being reintroduced by Chief Executive Tung Chee-hwa. The current Yau Tsim Mong District Council was established on 1 January 2000 after the first District Council election in 1999. The council has become fully elected when the appointed seats were abolished in 2011 after the modified constitutional reform proposal was passed by the Legislative Council in 2010.

The conservative independents dominated in the district as the lack of public housing estates made it difficult for the political parties to develop their community networks. The Hong Kong Association for Democracy and People's Livelihood (ADPL), the Democratic Party and the Democratic Alliance for the Betterment and Progress of Hong Kong (DAB) had been the three major parties which had continuing presence in the district, until in the 2007 election in which the DAB took a total number of seven seats, far ahead of the Democratic Party's one seat and ADPL which lost all their seats.

Business and Professionals Alliance for Hong Kong (BPA) Legislative Councillor Priscilla Leung's Kowloon West New Dynamic also absorbed numbers of conservative independents following the 2015 election and became the second largest party in the council. However, the pro-Beijing parties suffered major setbacks in the 2019 election amid the massive pro-democracy protests, while a pro-democracy local political group Community March emerged as the largest party in the council with the pro-democrats controlling the council for the first time.

Political control
Since 1994 political control of the council has been held by the following parties:

Political makeup

Elections are held every four years.

District result maps

Members represented
Starting from 1 January 2020:

Leadership

Chairs
Since 1985, the chairman is elected by all the members of the board:

Chairman of Mong Kok and Yau Ma Tei District Board

Chairman of Yau Tsim Mong District Council

Vice Chairs

Notes

References

 
Districts of Hong Kong
Yau Tsim Mong District